Michael R. Fenzel is a United States Army lieutenant general who serves as the United States Security Coordinator of the Israel-Palestinian Authority since November 2021. He most recently served as the vice director for strategy, plans, and policy of the Joint Staff. Prior to serving in that position, he was the senior military advisor to the Special Representative for Afghanistan Reconciliation in the United States Department of State. During the September 11 attacks, Fenzel, as a major, was on a White House Fellowship serving under Richard Clarke. He was tasked to join Vice President Dick Cheney in the Presidential Emergency Operations Center and liaise with Clarke.

In July 2021, Fenzel was nominated for promotion to lieutenant general and assignment as the United States Security Coordinator for the Israel-Palestinian Authority, replacing Mark C. Schwartz.

Awards and decorations

References

1967 births
Living people
Recipients of the Legion of Merit
United States Army generals
United States Army personnel of the Gulf War
United States Army personnel of the Iraq War
United States Army personnel of the War in Afghanistan (2001–2021)